Wurmbea latifolia, also known as Broadleaf Early Nancy, is a species of plant in the Colchicaceae family that is endemic to Australia.

Subspecies
 Wurmbea latifolia subsp. latifolia
 Wurmbea latifolia subsp. vanessae

Description
The species is a cormous perennial herb that grows to a height of 5–15 cm. Its white to faintly purple flowers appear from late winter to spring.

Distribution and habitat
The species is found in New South Wales, Victoria and Tasmania. It grows mainly in heavy soils.

References

latifolia
Monocots of Australia
Flora of New South Wales
Flora of Victoria (Australia)
Flora of Tasmania
Plants described in 1980
Taxa named by Terry Desmond Macfarlane